Johnny Arthur (born John Lennox Arthur Williams; May 20, 1883 – December 31, 1951) was an American stage and motion picture actor.

Early years
Born in Scottdale, Pennsylvania, Arthur was a veteran of twenty-five years on stage before he made his screen debut in 1923's The Unknown Purple. Arthur's screen personality was nebulous enough to allow him to play the romantic lead in the  Lon Chaney vehicle The Monster (1925).

Talkie era
With the coming of sound, Arthur developed his first comedic image, an effeminate character in films such as The Desert Song (1929), She Couldn't Say No (1930), Penrod and Sam (1931) and The Ghost Walks (1934). When the Production Code took effect on July 1, 1934, the overtly homosexual characters played by Arthur were toned down in Hollywood movies. He spent the rest of the 1930s playing fussy characters. This served him well in low-budget films like The Natzy Nuisance, Ellis Island and Danger on the Air, as well as big budget pictures like Crime and Punishment and Road to Singapore.

Arthur is perhaps most remembered for his appearances as Darla Hood's father in Hal Roach's Our Gang shorts. Most of his later roles were unbilled bits, with the notable exception of the 1942 serial, The Masked Marvel.

Death
Arthur died on December 31, 1951, at the Motion Picture Country Home. He was buried at the charitable expense of the Motion Picture Fund in Valhalla Memorial Park Cemetery, but left in an unmarked grave for 60 years until the Friends of Dearly Departed Tours and Findadeath.com raised the funds for a gravestone and placed one in November 2012.

Selected filmography

The Unknown Purple (1923) - Freddie Goodlittle
Mademoiselle Midnight (1924) - Carlos de Quiros
Daring Love (1924)
The Monster (1925) - The Under Clerk
The Tourist (1925, Short)
Cleaning Up (1925, Short) - The Husband
My Stars (1926, Short) - Johnny
Home Cured (1926, Short) - The Hypochondriac
Honest Injun (1926, Short) - Johnny Peppercorn
Open House (1926, Short) - Mr. Brown
The Humdinger (1926, Short) - Johnny - the Small Town Boob
Close Shaves (1926, Short) - The Barber
Wedding Yells (1927, Short) - The Groom
The Draw-Back (1927, Short) - Horace Hayseed
Her Husky Hero (1927, Short) - The Henpecked Husband
Live News (1927, Short) - The Young Reporter
Scared Silly (1927, Short)
Wildcat Valley (1928, Short)
Visitors Welcome (1928, Short) - The Husband
Blondes Beware (1928, Short)
Wedded Blisters (1928, Short)
On Trial (1928) - Stanley Glover
The Eligible Mr. Bangs (1929, Short) - Tom
The Desert Song (1929) - Benny Kidd
Hot Lemonade (1929, Short) - The Lothario
The Gamblers (1929) - George Cowper
Lovers' Delight (1929, Short)
Divorce Made Easy (1929) - Percy Deering
A Hint to Brides (1929, Short) - The Newlywed Husband
Adam's Eve (1929, Short)
The Show of Shows (1929) - Hero - Performer in 'The Pirate'
The Aviator (1929) - Hobart
Personality (1930) - Sandy Jenkins
She Couldn't Say No (1930) - Tommy Blake
Scrappily Married (1930, Short)
Down with Husbands (1930, Short) - Henry Sweet
Paper Hanging with Johnny Arthur (1930, Short) - Johnny
Cheer Up and Smile (1930) - Andy
Going Wild (1930) - Simpkins
It's a Wise Child (1931) - Otho Peabody
Penrod and Sam (1931) - Mr. Bassett
Should Crooners Marry (1933, Short)
 Easy Millions (1933)
Convention City (1933) - Leonard Travis
Registered Nurse (1934) - Ambulance Attendant (uncredited)
Twenty Million Sweethearts (1934) - Norma Hanson's Secretary
Many Happy Returns (1934) - Davis
Dames (1934) - Billings - Ounce's Secretary
The Ghost Walks (1934) - Homer Erskine
Hell in the Heavens (1934) - Clarence Perkins
Anniversary Trouble (1935, Short) - John Spanky's Father
Traveling Saleslady (1935) - Melton
Doubting Thomas (1935) - Ralph Twiller
Here Comes the Band (1935) - Audience Member (uncredited)
It's in the Air (1935) - Jones, Photographer
Rendezvous (1935) - Code Room Clerk (uncredited)
Crime and Punishment (1935) - Clerk
Too Tough to Kill (1935) - Willie Dent
The Bride Comes Home (1935) - Otto
The Murder of Dr. Harrigan (1936) - Mr. Wentworth
Freshman Love (1936) - Mr. Fields
All-American Toothache (1936, Short) - Dental Professor
The King Steps Out (1936) - Chief of the Secret Police
The Ex-Mrs. Bradford (1936) - Mr. Frankenstein, Process Server (uncredited)
Stage Struck (1936) - Oscar Freud
Our Relations (1936) - Denker's Beer Garden / Nightclub Customer (uncredited)
Ellis Island (1936) - Kip Andrews
Under Cover of Night (1937) - Dr. Busby - Coroner
The Hit Parade (1937) - Success-Story Teller (uncredited)
It Happened Out West (1937) - Thad Crookshank
Pick a Star (1937) - Newlywed
Night 'n' Gales (1937, Short) - Arthur Hood, Darla's father
Make a Wish (1937) - Antoine
Fit for a King (1937) - Plotter (uncredited)
Something to Sing About (1937) - Mr. Daviani
Blossoms on Broadway (1937) - P.J. Quinterfield Jr.
Amateur Crook (1937) - Pedestrian (uncredited)
Every Day's a Holiday (1937) - Bit Part (uncredited)
Exiled to Shanghai (1937) - Poppolas
Feed 'em and Weep (1938, Short) - Johnny Hood, Darla's Father
One Wild Night (1938) - Murgatroyd (uncredited)
Danger on the Air (1938) - Aiken
Half-way to Hollywood (1938, Short) - Johnny
You Can't Take It with You (1938) - Kirby's Office Aide (uncredited)
Fugitives for a Night (1938) - Tootsies - Car Rental Man (uncredited)
Jeepers Creepers (1939) - Peabody
Road to Singapore (1940) - Timothy Willow (uncredited)
Scatterbrain (1940) - (uncredited)
Li'l Abner (1940) - Montague
Road Show (1941) - Mr. N - Asylum Inmate (uncredited)
Tight Shoes (1941) - Chapel Manager (uncredited)
Mountain Moonlight (1941) - Holbrook
Always Tomorrow: The Portrait of an American Business (1941) - Larry Larabee
Shepherd of the Ozarks (1942) - Doolittle
A Desperate Chance for Ellery Queen (1942) - Riley - Reporter (uncredited)
Moonlight Masquerade (1942) - Minor Role (uncredited)
Henry Aldrich Gets Glamour (1943) - Hotchkiss (uncredited)
That Nazty Nuisance (1943) - Suki Yaki
The Masked Marvel (1943) - Mura Sakima
This Is the Life (1944) - Mr. Ferguson (uncredited)
Take It Big (1944) - Desk Clerk (uncredited)
It's in the Bag! (1945) - Finley (uncredited)
Follow That Woman (1945) - Jeweler (uncredited)
It Happened on 5th Avenue (1947) - Apartment Manager (uncredited)
I Want You (1951) - (uncredited)

References

External links

Johnny Arthur at Virtual History

1883 births
1951 deaths
Male actors from Pennsylvania
American male silent film actors
American male film actors
Burials at Valhalla Memorial Park Cemetery
People from Westmoreland County, Pennsylvania
20th-century American male actors
Our Gang